is a Quasi-National Park in Aichi Prefecture, Japan. It is rated a protected landscape (category V) according to the IUCN.
The park includes the coastal areas of Atsumi Peninsula, the Pacific shoreline of Chita Peninsula as well as islands and portion of the northern shoreline of Mikawa Bay.

It was founded on 10 April 1958 and has an area of 94.4 km².

Like all Quasi-National Parks in Japan, the park is managed by the local prefectural governments.

See also
List of national parks of Japan

References
Southerland, Mary and Britton, Dorothy. The National Parks of Japan. Kodansha International (1995). 

National parks of Japan
Parks in Aichi Prefecture
Protected areas established in 1958